Francesco Rosa (died 1500) was a Roman Catholic prelate who served as Bishop of Terracina, Priverno e Sezze (1490–1500).

Biography

Francesco was a native of Terracina, and held the degree of Doctor of law. On 20 November 1486, Pope Innocent VIII named him Bishop of Foligno.

On 3 March 1490, Francesco Rosa was appointed Bishop of Terracina, Priverno e Sezze by Innocent VIII.
He served as Bishop of Terracina, Priverno e Sezze until his death in 1500.

References

External links and additional sources
 (for Chronology of Bishops) 
 (for Chronology of Bishops) 

15th-century Italian Roman Catholic bishops
16th-century Italian Roman Catholic bishops
Bishops appointed by Pope Innocent VIII
1500 deaths